Sixten Boström (born 15 September 1963) is a Finnish soccer coach and former midfielder, who most recently served as the head coach of SJK. 

Previously, he worked as an assistant coach under Gregg Berhalter for Columbus Crew of Major League Soccer after being hired in February 2015. Together, they reached the MLS Cup in 
2015.

Early life and career
Boström was born in Helsinki to a Swedish-speaking family. He played for local team HJK before moving to Häcken, Geylang International, Kuusysi and FinnPa during his playing days. He earned 14 caps for Finland, scoring 2 goals.

As a head coach, Boström was in charge of Ekenäs, Jaro and Örebro before joining HJK in 2013. A poor start to the following season led to his firing on 29 April 2014 despite winning the Veikkausliiga in his first season.

Coaching record

Honors

Player

HJK
Mestaruussarja: 1981, 1987
Finnish Cup: 1981

Kuusysi
Mestaruussarja: 1989
Veikkausliiga: 1991

Geylang International
FAS Premier League: 1988, 1990

Jurong Town
President's Cup: 1989

Coach

HJK
Veikkausliiga: 2013

References

External links

1963 births
Living people
Finnish footballers
Finnish expatriate footballers
Finland international footballers
Helsingin Jalkapalloklubi players
FinnPa players
BK Häcken players
Geylang International FC players
Finnish expatriates in Singapore
Jurong FC players
Finnish expatriate sportspeople in Thailand
Finnish football managers
FF Jaro managers
Örebro SK managers
Helsingin Jalkapalloklubi managers
Finnish expatriate sportspeople in Sweden
Expatriate footballers in Sweden
Expatriate football managers in Sweden
Swedish-speaking Finns
Columbus Crew non-playing staff
Finnish expatriate sportspeople in the United States
Association football midfielders
Footballers from Helsinki